Luther James Rabb (September 7, 1942 – January 22, 2006) was an American singer, musician, and songwriter, from Seattle, Washington, who gained notoriety as the lead vocalist of the jazz rock group Ballin' Jack and in later years as a member of the group War.

Early history
The son of a minister, Luther grew up in Seattle. He learned to play practicing on his grandmother's piano. He began learning sax at the age of ten. As a teenager he was doing gigs at his local rotary club. He was also a sax player in The Velvetones which was Jimi Hendrix's first band. Between that time and his membership with Ballin' Jack, he had been with the groups The Stags, The Nite Sounds, and The Emergency Exit.

Seventies onwards
Luther was a member of Ballin' Jack, a group he had founded in 1969 and stayed with them until the group's break up in or around 1974. In 1976 he had become part of Santana as the group's lead singer and was on tour with them in 1976. In 1977 he was working with Lola Falana, had released his solo LP in 1979 and by the 1980s he was a member of the group War. 

Rabb died in January 2006 at the age of 63.

Discography

Singles
 "Make a Little Move (On the One)" / "Street Angels" (1979) MCA Mca 40997
 "Seattle Sonics Do It" / "Seattle Sonics Do It" (1979) MCA Mca 41066
 "Every Day Love" / "Whatever" (1979) MCA Mca 41104

Albums
 Street Angel (1979) MCA Records Mca-3079

Sound tracks
 "Bucktown Song" in the closing credits of the 1975 film Bucktown.

References

External links
 Luther James Rabb
 

1942 births
2006 deaths
Musicians from Seattle
American male singer-songwriters
American rock singers
American rock songwriters
20th-century American singers
Singer-songwriters from Washington (state)
20th-century American male singers